Richard Bell (died 1496) was a Bishop of Carlisle. He was selected 11 February 1478, and consecrated 26 April 1478. He resigned the see on 4 September 1495, and died in 1496.  He served as Prior of Finchale from 1457 to 1464.

Citations

References

 
 

Bishops of Carlisle
15th-century English Roman Catholic bishops
1496 deaths
Year of birth unknown